Volodymyr Bileka (born 6 February 1979 in Drohobych) is a Ukrainian professional road bicycle racer. As with teammate and compatriot Yaroslav Popovych, he showed promise by winning numerous races as a junior before turning professional.

Doping cases
On 3 May 2008 Bileka sent a letter to  team management announcing his resignation from the team due to personal reasons, later revealed to be a positive test for EPO that resulted in a two-year ban. He made a comeback in professional cycling in 2010, riding for lower ranked teams. In 2012, while riding for Torku Şeker Spor, he tested positive for pseudoephedrine at the first stage of Tour of Trakya. He is now under a four-year-long suspension that will end 1 July 2016.

Major results

2001
 1st Stage 6 Thüringen Rundfahrt
 2nd Paris–Roubaix Espoirs
2002
 1st Poreč Trophy 1
 2nd Poreč Trophy 2
 9th GP Chiasso
2004
 10th Coppa Bernocchi
2005
 3rd Overall Circuit de la Sarthe
 9th Overall Volta ao Algarve
 3rd Time trial, National Road Championships
2006
 3rd Time trial, National Road Championships
2007
 5th Overall Driedaagse van West Vlaanderen
2010
 10th Overall Tour of Hainan
2011
 1st Trophée de l'Anniversaire, Challenge du Prince
 3rd Time trial, National Road Championships
 8th Trophée Princier, Challenge du Prince
2012
 4th Time trial, National Road Championships
 5th Overall Azerbaïjan Tour
 5th Overall Istrian Spring Trophy
 5th GP Sakia El Hamra, Les Challenges de la Marche Verte
 6th Overall Tour du Maroc
1st Mountains classification
 6th Poreč Trophy

References

External links

 Volodymyr Bileka at dopeology.org

Ukrainian male cyclists
Living people
1979 births
Doping cases in cycling
Ukrainian sportspeople in doping cases
People from Drohobych
Sportspeople from Lviv Oblast